Antti Tuisku (born 27 February 1984) is a Finnish pop singer. He finished third in the 2003 Idols talent show, the Finnish version of Pop Idol. Tuisku has sold over 300,000 records during his career in Finland.

In 2016, Tuisku won the Best Male Artist 2015 award at Emma-gaala. His 2016 album En kommentoi received the Record of the Year and Best Pop Album of the Year awards.

Career

En kommentoi 
Tuisku's 10th album En kommentoi was released in May 2015. The album spent nine weeks at number one on the Official Finnish Album Chart.

After the success of the album he embarked on the Peto on irti tour. In April 2016 he sold out two concerts at Hartwall Arena in Helsinki. The two concerts gathered together over 22 000 fans.

Other ventures 
Tuisku appeared in the film Joulutarina in 2007. He has also voiced Arthur in the movie Shrek the Third. In 2010 Tuisku won the Finnish version of Dancing with the Stars. He participated in the Vain elämää  television show's fourth season in 2015.

Tuisku is well-known for his flamboyant and extravagant style. He is also active as a fashion designer. In April 2016 Antti Tuisku released his first clothing line Antti Tuisku by Seppälä in collaboration with the Finnish clothing chain Seppälä. He was the host of Uuden musiikin kilpailu 2021.

Discography

Studio albums

Compilation albums

Others

EPs

Singles

Other charted songs

See also
 List of best-selling music artists in Finland

References

External links 
 Official website 

1984 births
Living people
21st-century Finnish male singers
Warner Music Group artists
Finnish pop singers
People from Rovaniemi